Brita Öberg (22 May 1900 – 26 December 1969) was a Swedish actress. She appeared in more than 40 films between 1931 and 1969.

Selected filmography

  Kristin Commands (1946)
 Between Brothers (1946)
 Son of the Sea (1949)
 Storm Over Tjurö (1954)
 Luffaren och Rasmus (1955)
 Men in the Dark (1955)
 Moon Over Hellesta (1956)
 The Minister of Uddarbo (1957)
 A Dreamer's Journey (1957)
 No Tomorrow (1957)
 Åsa-Nisse in Military Uniform (1958)
 Åsa-Nisse as a Policeman (1960)
 Ormen (1966)
 Rooftree (1967)
 The Passion of Anna (1969)

References

External links

1900 births
1969 deaths
20th-century Swedish actresses
Swedish film actresses
Swedish television actresses
Place of birth missing